Maheshwari Amma, better known by her stage name K. P. A. C. Lalitha (10 March 1947 – 22 February 2022), was an Indian film and stage actress who worked primarily in the Malayalam film industry. She started her acting career with Kerala People's Arts Club, a theatre collective in Kayamkulam, Kerala. In a career spanning five decades, she starred in over 550 films.

Lalitha won two National Film Awards for Best Supporting Actress along with four Kerala State Film Awards. In 2009, she was honoured with the Filmfare Lifetime Achievement Award at the 2009 Filmfare Awards South. Lalitha latterly served as the chairperson of Kerala Sangeetha Nataka Akademi. She was married to the late Malayalam filmmaker Bharathan.

Early life
Lalitha was born as Maheshwari Amma at Kayamkulam on 10 March 1947. She was born to Kadaykatharayil Veettil Ananthan Nair and Bhargavi Amma, as the eldest among five children; her four siblings were Indira, Babu, Rajan and Shyamala. She is the child born five years after her parent's marriage. Her father was a photographer who was from Kayamkulam and mother was a housewife who was from Aranmula. She spent most of her childhood at Ramapuram near Kayamkulam.

Her family migrated to Changanassery, Kottayam for her to join dance class. In a young age itself she had very much interest in dance. She learned to dance when she was a child under the guidance of Chellappan Pillai and then under Kalamandalam Gangadharan. She started acting in plays when she was 10 years old.
Her first appearance on stage was in the play Geethayude Bali. She later joined Kerala People's Arts Club (K. P. A. C.), which was a prominent leftist drama troupe in Kerala. She was given the stage name Lalitha and later, when she started acting in movies, the tag K.P.A.C. was added to her screen-name to differentiate it from another actress known as Lalitha.

Acting career
Her first movie was the film adaptation of Koottukudumbam directed by K. S. Sethumadhavan. In 1978 she married Bharathan, a noted Malayalam film director. She took a break from film acting for sometime, doing only a few films.

The second era of her career started with Kattathe Kilikkoodu (1983) directed by her husband. Her pairing with Innocent was hugely popular with the audience between 1986 and 2006 with successful films like Gajakesariyogam, Apporvam Chillar, Makkal Mahatmiyam, Shubha Yatra, My Dear Muthachan, Kannanum Polisum, Arjunan Pillaiyum Anju Makkalum, Injankaddai Mathan and Sons, Pavam Pavam Rajakumaram. During this time, she did many critically acclaimed roles including those in Kattukuthira (1990), Sanmanassullavarkku Samadhanam (1986), Ponn Muttyidunna Tharavu (1988), Kottayam Kunjachan (1990), Vadakkunokkiyantram (1989), Innathe Program (1991),  Dasharatham (1989), Kanalkkattu (1991),Venkalam (1993), Godfather (1991), Amaram (1991), Vietnam Colony (1993), Pavithram (1993), Manichitrathazhu (1994), Spadikam (1995), and Aniyathipraavu (1997). She won the National Film Award for Best Supporting Actress for her performance in Amaram (1991), a film directed by her husband Bharathan.

In 1998, when her husband Bharathan died, she took a break for a few months, only to come back with an acclaimed performance in Sathyan Anthikkad directed Veendum Chila Veetukaryangal (1999). K.P.A.C. Lalitha's notable roles after that were in Shantham (2000), Life Is Beautiful (2000) and Valkannadi (2002). She won her second National Film Award for Best Supporting Actress for her role in Shantham (2000), directed by Jayaraj.

K.P.A.C. Lalitha acted in over 500 films in Malayalam cinema. Apart from Malayalam, she acted in some Tamil films including Kadhalukku Mariyadhai (1997), Maniratnam's Alai Payuthey (2000) and Kaatru Veliyidai (2017). Particularly, her performance in Tamil film Kadhalukku Mariyadhai as Shalini's mother won her critical acclaim.

Personal life and death
Lalitha had a daughter Sreekutty and a son Sidharth who debuted as an actor in the movie Nammal, which was directed by Kamal. After a short career in acting, he chose a career in film direction. In 2012, he made his directorial debut with Nidra, which is the remake of 1984 film with the same title written and directed by his father Bharathan.

She published an autobiography, titled Katha Thudarum (Story To Be Continued), which won the Cherukad Award in 2013.

Lalitha died in Thrippunithura on 22 February 2022, at the age of 74. She had been hospitalised since November 2021 due to multiple health issues, including liver ailment and diabetes. Her mortal remains was taken to her home in Wadakkancherry, and was cremated with full state honours.

Filmography

Awards

National Film Awards
 1990: Best Supporting Actress – Amaram
 2000: Best Supporting Actress – Shantham

Kerala State Film Awards
 1975: Second Best Actress – Neela Ponman, Onnum Lelle (1975)
 1978: Second Best Actress – Aaravam
 1990: Second Best Actress – Amaram
 1991: Second Best Actress – Kadinjool Kalyanam, Godfather, Sandesam

Asianet Film Awards
 2000: Best Supporting Actress – Shantham
 2007: Best Supporting Actress – Thaniye, Nasrani, Aakasham
 2011: Best Supporting Actress – Snehaveedu

Filmfare Awards South
 2009: Filmfare Lifetime Achievement Award

 Other awards
 2007: Premji Award 
 2009: Thoppil Bhasi Prathibha Award
 2009: Annual Malayalam Movie Award (Dubai) for Best Outstanding Performances
 2010: Bharat Murali Award 
 2011: Bahadoor Award
 2011: Kambisseri Karunakaran Award
2012: Thoppil Bhasi Prathibha Award
2013: MT Chandrasenan Award
 2013: Cherukad Award for Literature for Autobiography "Katha Thudarum" (Writer)
 2014: Kerala Sangeetha Nataka Akademi Fellowship
 2014: Sangam Lifetime Achievement Award
 2014:Vanithalokam Award
 2015: Part-Ono Films- Samaadharanam-'Prashasthipathram'
 2015: SIIMA Lifetime Achievement Award
 2015: Vanitha Film Award – Lifetime Achievement
 2015:TCR Bharath P.J.Antony Smaraka Abhinaya Prathibha Award
 2015:IIFA Awards IIFA Utsavam – Performance in a Supporting Role (Female) – Nominated
 2016: Parabrahma Chaithanya Award
 PK Rosy Award
 Devarajan Master Award
 Good Knight Film and Business Awards 2017

See also
 Bharathan
 Kerala State Film Awards
 National Film Award for Best Supporting Actress

References

External links
 

2022 deaths
20th-century Indian actresses
21st-century Indian actresses
Best Supporting Actress National Film Award winners
Kerala State Film Award winners
People from Aranmula
Indian television actresses
Actresses from Kerala
Indian film actresses
Filmfare Awards South winners
Actresses in Malayalam cinema
Actresses in Tamil cinema
Actresses from Thrissur
Indian voice actresses
Actresses in Malayalam television
Indian stage actresses
Actresses in Malayalam theatre
Indian actresses
South Indian International Movie Awards winners
1947 births
Recipients of the Kerala Sangeetha Nataka Akademi Fellowship